Mama's Broke are a Canadian folk music duo from Halifax, Nova Scotia, consisting of Amy Lou Keeler and Lisa Maria. They are most noted as winners of the Canadian Folk Music Award for Ensemble of the Year at the 13th Canadian Folk Music Awards in 2017 for their debut album Count the Wicked.

Their style draws on bluegrass and Eastern European folk music influences. Maria performs vocals, fiddle, mandolin, banjo and guitar, and Keeler performs vocals, guitar, banjo and fiddlesticks.

Their second album, Narrow Line, was released in 2022, and received a CFMA nomination for Vocal Group of the Year at the 18th Canadian Folk Music Awards and a Juno Award nomination for Traditional Roots Album of the Year at the Juno Awards of 2023.

References

External links

Canadian bluegrass music groups
Canadian musical duos
Musical groups from Halifax, Nova Scotia
Canadian Folk Music Award winners